Samil Grigoe is a Romanian sprint canoer who competed in the late 1990s. He won a silver medal at the 1999 ICF Canoe Sprint World Championships in Milan.

References

Living people
Romanian male canoeists
Year of birth missing (living people)
ICF Canoe Sprint World Championships medalists in Canadian